Libertine is the fourth solo studio album by the Norwegian artist Liv Kristine.

Track listing
 "Interlude" - 2:23
 "Solve Me" - 3:46
 "Silence" - 3:49
 "Vanilla Skin Delight" - 4:09
 "Panic" - 3:31
 "Paris Paris" - 3:40
 "Wait for Rain" - 3:32
 "Love Crime" - 2:24
 "Libertine" - 4:45
 "Meet Me in the Red Sky" - 5:11
 "The Man with the Child in His Eyes" (Kate Bush cover) - 2:30

Personnel
Liv Kristine - vocals
Thorsten Bauer - guitars
Alexander Krull - keyboards, programming, samples
Felix Born - drums
Alessandro Pantò - piano

Additional personnel
Tobias Regner - vocals on "Vanilla Skin Delight"
Christoph Kutzer - cello

References

www.livkristine.net

Liv Kristine albums
Pop rock albums by Norwegian artists
2012 albums
Napalm Records albums
Albums produced by Alexander Krull